New York's 7th State Senate district is one of 63 districts in the New York State Senate. It has been represented by Republican Jack Martins since 2023, following his defeat of incumbent Democrat Anna Kaplan.

Geography
District 7 covers northwestern Nassau County on Long Island. It is based in the town of North Hempstead, but also reaches into small areas of Hempstead and Oyster Bay.

The district overlaps with New York's 3rd, 4th, and 5th congressional districts, and with the 13th, 15th, 16th, 19th, and 22nd districts of the New York State Assembly.

Recent election results

2020

2018

2016

2014

2012

Federal results in District 7

References

07